Pavel Polomský (born January 8, 1966) is a Czech bobsledder who competed from the mid-1990s to 2005. Competing in two Winter Olympics, he earned his best finish of seventh in the two-man event (tied with Canada) at Lillehammer in 1994.

Polomský would later compete for Slovakia in bobsleigh before retiring in 2005. He now lives in Liberec, Czech Republic.

References
1994 bobsleigh two-man results
1994 bobsleigh four-man results
1998 bobsleigh two-man results
1998 bobsleigh four-man results
FIBT profile

1966 births
Bobsledders at the 1994 Winter Olympics
Bobsledders at the 1998 Winter Olympics
Czech male bobsledders
Czechoslovak male bobsledders
Living people
Olympic bobsledders of the Czech Republic